Emmy Stradal (née Ecker; 1877–1925) was an Austrian housewife-turned-politician and a feminist. Being a member of the German People's Party she served at the Parliament. She was among the early supporters of girls' education in Austria.

Biography
She was born Emilie Maria Sofie Ecker in Wolkersdorf on 28 October 1877. Her father Michael Ecker was a notary in Stockerau, and through her mother, Adele Ecker, she was related to the Moravian journalist Emil Pindter. She attended elementary and public schools in Stockerau. On 11 August 1896, at the age of only nineteen, she married Adalbert Stradal, who was sixteen years her senior and came from a German-Bohemian family. They had four children: Hedwig, Hermann, Albert and Otto.

Stradal was part of the middle-class women's movement. She joined the People’s Party at the early period of the First Austrian Republic and represented the party at the Parliament between 1920 and 1923. She contributed to the efforts of Therese Schlesinger in relation to female students' access to boys’ high schools and higher education. Stradal also argued that women’s secondary schools should be established and that private girls’ schools should be made public schools. Her first proposal was legalized with a ministerial decree dated 30 July 1921. She died in 1925.

References

20th-century Austrian women politicians
1877 births
1925 deaths
Members of the National Council (Austria)
German People's Party politicians
People from Mistelbach District
Austrian feminists
Austrian women's rights activists